Schomburgk is a surname. Notable people with the surname include:

Robert Hermann Schomburgk (1804–1865), German-born explorer for Great Britain in the nineteenth century (whose botanical abbreviation is R.H.Schomb.)
Moritz Richard Schomburgk (1811–1891), his brother, director of the Adelaide Botanic Garden (whose botanical abbreviation is M.R.Schomb.)
Hans Schomburgk (1880–1967), German explorer and film-maker
Heinrich Schomburgk, German tennis player

See also
Schomburgkia a genus of orchids